Kip Charles Miller (born June 11, 1969) is an American former ice hockey forward. He last played for the American Hockey League Grand Rapids Griffins in 2006–07. He was drafted by the Quebec Nordiques as their 4th-round pick in the 1987 NHL Entry Draft, 72nd overall.

Playing career
Miller was born in Lansing, Michigan, and played college hockey for the Michigan State University Spartans. During his college career he registered 116 goals, 145 assists and 261 points, leading the CCHA in scoring for two consecutive seasons. Miller was awarded the Hobey Baker Memorial Award in 1990, the first Spartan to receive the honor. Miller's cousin, goaltender Ryan Miller, was the second Spartan to win the Hobey Baker Award in 2001. In all, ten members of Miller's family (including his brothers Kevin and Kelly) have played college hockey for Michigan State. Kip's other cousin and Ryan Miller's brother is Drew Miller who played for the Detroit Red Wings.
During his twelve-year NHL career, Miller played for the Nordiques, Minnesota North Stars, San Jose Sharks, New York Islanders, Chicago Blackhawks, Pittsburgh Penguins, Mighty Ducks of Anaheim and Washington Capitals.

Miller is the only player in New York Islanders history to play for the team three different times.

Career statistics

Regular season and playoffs

International

Awards and honors

See also

Notable families in the NHL

References

External links
 

1969 births
Living people
American men's ice hockey centers
Chicago Blackhawks players
Chicago Wolves players
Denver Grizzlies players
Grand Rapids Griffins players
Halifax Citadels players
Hobey Baker Award winners
Ice hockey players from Michigan
Indianapolis Ice players
Kalamazoo Wings (1974–2000) players
Kansas City Blades players
Michigan State Spartans men's ice hockey players
Mighty Ducks of Anaheim players
Minnesota North Stars players
New York Islanders players
Sportspeople from Lansing, Michigan
Pittsburgh Penguins players
Quebec Nordiques draft picks
Quebec Nordiques players
San Jose Sharks players
Utah Grizzlies (AHL) players
Washington Capitals players
AHCA Division I men's ice hockey All-Americans